The China Times (abbr. ) is a daily Chinese-language newspaper published in Taiwan. It is one of the four largest newspapers in Taiwan. It is owned by Want Want, which also owns TV stations CTV and CTiTV.

History
The China Times was founded in February 1950 under the name Credit News, and focused mainly on price indices. The name changed on January 1, 1960, to Credit Newspaper, a daily with comprehensive news coverage. Color printing was introduced on March 29, 1968, the first newspaper in Asia to make the move. On September 1, 1968, the name changed once again to China Times, presently based in the Wanhua District, Taipei.

The founder, died in 2002, leaving the presidency of the paper to his second son, . Yu Chi-chung's eldest daughter, Yu Fan-ing, is the vice president. The bureau chief is Lin Shengfen, the general manager Huang Chao-sung, and the chief editor Huang Ch'ing-lung.

In 2008, the China Times Group was sold to the Want Want Holdings Limited, the largest rice cake manufacturer in Taiwan.
The China Times Publishing Company was the first publishing company in Taiwan to publicly issue shares.

China Times once managed a Taiwan-based baseball team, the China Times Eagles, but a betting scandal dissolved the team seven years into its operation. The China Times Group has set up several charity organizations (Chinatimes Foundation and China Times Cultural Foundation).

In 2019, the Financial Times published a report alleging that the China Times as well as Chung T'ien Television, also owned by Want Want, took daily orders from the Taiwan Affairs Office.  The Want Want China Times Media Group subsequently filed defamation claims against the Financial Times and announced the intent to file defamation claims against any news organization that cited the Financial Times report. Reporters Without Borders called the lawsuit a "an abusive libel suit” and accused Want Want of harassing an experienced journalist. The lawsuit was dropped by Want Want on March 11, 2021.

Other publications and related activities
 The Commercial Times (1978)
 The China Times (U.S. Edition) (1982)
 , published between 1988 and 2005
  The first print edition was published on 5 March 1978, as a monthly magazine titled China Times Magazine. The publication transitioned to a weekly format in 1988, accompanied by a name change to China Times Weekly.  The website and digital edition were established in 2019, and the final print edition was published on 25 August 2021.
 www.chinatimes.com (1995)
 The China Times''' literary supplement is called Human Realm.
 China Times is associated with the Japanese newspaper Daily Yomiuri, including cooperation between China Times Travel Agency and Daily Yomiuri Travel Agency.
 WantChinaTimes.com, established in 2010, is an English-language Chinese news website owned by The China Times Group. The site often reprints news items from the English-language edition of the PRC-controlled Xinhua News Agency.  According to Chien-Jung Hsu, the professor at National Dong Hwa University, "Want China Times seems to be a representative of the Xinhua News Agency in Taiwan."

Awards
China Times Open Book Award:
Established in 1989 by its literary supplement, Open Book, annual awards are given to 50 book categories, including fiction, non-fiction and children's

Political position
Since China Times was bought by the pro-China Taiwanese businessman tycoon Tsai Eng-Meng, head of Want Want Holdings Limited, in 2008, the Times has veered into an editorial stance more sympathetic to the positions of the Chinese Communist Party. It has since been criticized of being "very biased" in favor of positive news about China. In a 2020 interview with Stand News, an anonymous Times journalist described the editorial stance of the paper as having changed completely after Tsai's acquisition. The interviewed journalist said the newspaper mandated the use of vocabulary that supports the PRC's positions on Taiwan, and prevented its reporters from covering topics that may be seen as against China, such as issues involving the 1989 Tiananmen Square protests. Tsai himself has openly admitted to airing commercials from PRC authorities.

Before Tsai Eng-Meng bought it, The political position of the China Times had been slanted towards the pan-blue coalition (pro-unification), although it was considered more moderate than the United Daily News. Relations with the Kuomintang nationalist government have in the past been close, but when the China Times U.S. Edition ceased publication after the Chiang Nan Murder Case in October 1984, the China Times broke with then KMT president Chiang Ching-kuo in protest. Since the 1980s, the China Times has developed a more liberal and pro-democratic stance, often concerned with progressive issues such as social justice or environmental concerns. During the 1990s, the China Times'' was often supportive of the opposition Democratic Progressive Party, more on the grounds of liberalism rather than Taiwanese Independence. China Television (CTV) used to be owned by the Kuomintang and was sold to the China Times group in 2006.

See also
 China Television (CTV)
 Chung T'ien Television (Cti TV)
 Media of Taiwan

References

External links
 Official site (in Traditional Chinese)
 Archived official site (in English)

Newspapers published in Taiwan
Chinese-language newspapers (Traditional Chinese)
Publications established in 1950
Mass media in Taipei
1950 establishments in Taiwan
Taiwanese companies established in 1950